The Joykiller is the 1995 eponymous debut album by American punk supergroup The Joykiller.

The cover art is by Frank Kozik.

Track listing

CD issue

References

1995 debut albums
The Joykiller albums
Epitaph Records albums